The 8th Indian Infantry Brigade was an infantry brigade formation of the Indian Army during World War II. It was formed in September 1939, in India. In November 1940, the brigade was assigned to the 11th Indian Infantry Division. The brigade was attached to the 9th Indian Infantry Division from March 1941. The brigade took part in the Malayan Campaign and surrendered with the rest of the Allied forces in February 1942, after the Battle of Singapore.

Formation
1st Battalion, 2nd Gurkha Rifles September 1939 to May 1940
2nd Battalion, Oxfordshire and Buckinghamshire Light Infantry September 1939
2nd Battalion, 18th Royal Garhwal Rifles September 1939 to September 1940 
3rd Battalion, 17th Dogra Regiment September 1939 to September 1940
2nd Battalion, 10th Baluch Regiment October 1939 to September 1940 
3rd Battalion, 17th Dogra Regiment October 1940 to June 1941 and October 1940 to December 1941 and January to February 1942
1st Battalion, 13th Frontier Force Rifles June 1941 to February 1942
2nd Battalion, 12th Frontier Force Regiment June 1941 to  December 1941
4th Battalion, 19th Hyderabad Regiment December 1941
5th Field Regiment . Royal Artillery January 1942
Composite Battalion 18 Royal Garhwal Rifles January to February 1942	 
1st Battalion, Bahawalpur Infantry February 1942
21st Mountain Battery Indian Artillery May 1941 to February 1942

See also

 List of Indian Army Brigades in World War II

References

British Indian Army brigades
Br